Sainbuyan Amarsaikhan is a Mongolian politician who is serving as Deputy Prime Minister of Mongolia and also served as Mayor and Governor of Ulaanbaatar.

References 

Mongolian politicians
Year of birth missing (living people)
Living people